Carlos Kalmar (born February 26, 1958, in Montevideo) is a Uruguayan conductor.

Biography
Kalmar began violin studies at age six. At age fifteen, he enrolled at the Vienna Academy of Music where his conducting teacher was Karl Österreicher. In 1984, he won first prize in the Hans Swarowsky Conducting Competition in Vienna.  Kalmar has been music director of the Hamburger Symphoniker (1987–91), the Stuttgart Philharmonic (1991–95), and the Anhaltisches Theater in Dessau.  He was principal conductor of the Tonkünstlerorchester, Vienna, from 2000 to 2003.  

In the USA, Kalmar has served the principal conductor of the Grant Park Music Festival in Chicago since 2000.  He is also music director of the Oregon Symphony, since 2003.  In April 2008, the orchestra announced the extension of Kalmar's contract as music director to the 2012–13 season.  In February 2020, the Oregon Symphony announced that Kalmar is to conclude his music directorship of the orchestra at the close of the 2020-2021 season.  In May 2021, the Cleveland Institute of Music announced the appointment of Kalmar as its next director of orchestral studies, effective 1 July 2021.

Kalmar currently lives with his second wife, Raffaela, a violinist and nurse, and their two sons, Luca and Claudio, in Shaker Heights, OH.  Kalmar was born to Jewish immigrant parents from Austria.

Recordings
 Music for a Time of War. Works by Charles Ives, John Adams, Benjamin Britten, Ralph Vaughan Williams. The Oregon Symphony. PENTATONE PTC 5186393 (2011)
 This England. Works by Edward Elgar, Ralph Vaughan Williams, Benjamin Britten. The Oregon Symphony. PENTATONE PTC 5186471 (2012)
 Spirit of the American Range. Works by George Antheil, Walter Piston, Aaron Copland. The Oregon Symphony. PENTATONE PTC 5186481 (2015)
 Haydn Symphonies. Carlos Kalmar, Oregon Symphony Orchestra. PENTATONE PTC 5186612 (2017)
Aspects of America. Carlos Kalmar , Oregon Symphony Orchestra. PENTATONE PTC 5186727 (2018)

Notes

References

External links
 Seldy Cramer Artists agency page on Carlos Kalmar
 Oregon Symphony biography of Carlos Kalmar
 Grant Park Music Festival, conductors biography page
 Bruce Duffie, Interview with Carlos Kalmar, July 12, 1999
 Oregon Art Beat: Conductor Carlos Kalmar's 10th Anniversary

1958 births
Living people
Male conductors (music)
Uruguayan male musicians
20th-century conductors (music)
21st-century conductors (music)
Musicians from Montevideo
Musicians from Portland, Oregon
Uruguayan conductors (music)
Uruguayan Jews
Uruguayan people of Austrian-Jewish descent
University of Music and Performing Arts Vienna alumni
Oregon Symphony
20th-century male musicians
21st-century male musicians
Cedille Records artists